The 1993 Colgate Red Raiders football team was an American football team that represented Colgate University during the 1993 NCAA Division I-AA football season. Colgate finished second-to-last in the Patriot League.

In its first season under head coach Ed Sweeney, the team compiled a 3–7–1 record. Tony Barrett, Mark Plaske and Bill Sparacio were the team captains. 

The Red Raiders were outscored 284 to 149. Colgate's 1–3–1 conference record placed fifth in the six-team Patriot League standings.

The team played its home games at Andy Kerr Stadium in Hamilton, New York.

Schedule

References

Colgate
Colgate Raiders football seasons
Colgate Red Raiders football